Regine Chevallier is a Haitian fashion designer. She has earned the title, "Hat Lady to the Stars" for her unique collection of "Haute Summer Hats".

Biography
Chevallier is from Port-au-Prince, Haiti and maintains a fashion-house based in Miami. She draws on her European-Haitian heritage for influence for her designs; a melange of African, French and Italian.

Chevallier is a former Consulate General of the Republic of Haiti in Miami.

References

External links
 Official website

Haitian fashion designers
People from Port-au-Prince
People from Miami
Haitian women in business
Haitian people of French descent
Haitian people of Italian descent
Haitian women fashion designers
Milliners